Alby is a nickname. Notable people with the nickname include:

 Alby Anderson (1894–1980), Australian rules footballer
 Alby Bahr (1881–1962), Australian rules footballer
 Alby Broadby (1917–2012) was an Australian politician
 Alby De Luca (1908–1978), Australian rules footballer
 Alby Dunn (born 1941), former Australian rules footballer
 Alby Falzon (born 1945), Australian surfing filmmaker, photographer and publisher
 Alby Green (1874–1913), Australian rules footballer and first-class cricketer
 Alby Ingleman (1886–1969), Australian rules footballer
 Alby Jacobsen (1902–1989), Australian rules footballer
 Alby Linton (1926–2010), Australian rules footballer
 Albert Lowerson (1896–1945), Australian recipient of the Victoria Cross in the First World War
 Alby Mangels (born 1948), Australian adventurer and documentary filmmaker 
 Alby Mathewson (born 1985), New Zealand rugby union player
 Alby Morrison (1920–1997), Australian rules footballer
 Alby Murdoch (1935–2010), Australian rules footballer
 Alby Naismith (born 1917), Australian rules footballer
 Alby O'Connor (1893–1944), Australian rules footballer
 Alby Outen (1902–2010), Australian rules footballer
 Alby Palmer (1885–1962), Australian rules footballer
 Alby Pannam (1914–1993), Australian rules footballer
 Alby Roberts (1909–1978), New Zealand cricketer
 Alby Rodda (born 1920), former Australian rules football player
 Alby Schultz (born 1945), Australian politician
 Alby Tame (1877–1965), Australian rules footballer
 Alby Thorne, Australian rugby league footballer in the 1930s and 1940s
 Alby Weiss (1914–1999), Australian rules footballer

See also
Albie (given name)
Albert (given name)

Lists of people by nickname
Hypocorisms